Christopher Hart is a Democratic member of the South Carolina House of Representatives, serving since 2007. Hart served in the Army National Guard from 1989 to 1998.

References

External links

Legislative page

Living people
Democratic Party members of the South Carolina House of Representatives
Politicians from Columbia, South Carolina
Howard University alumni
University of South Carolina alumni
African-American state legislators in South Carolina
1972 births
Lawyers from Columbia, South Carolina
21st-century American politicians
21st-century African-American politicians
20th-century African-American people